The Kingdom of Kosala was an ancient Indian kingdom with a rich culture, corresponding to the area within the region of Awadh in present-day Uttar Pradesh to Western Odisha. It emerged as a small state during the late Vedic period, with connections to the neighbouring realm of Videha. Kosala belonged to the Northern Black Polished Ware culture (c. 700–300 BCE), and the Kosala region gave rise to the Sramana movements, including Jainism and Buddhism. It was culturally distinct from the Painted Grey Ware culture of the Vedic period of Kuru-Panchala west of it, following independent development toward urbanisation and the use of iron.

During the 5th century BCE, Kosala incorporated the territory of the Shakya clan, to which the Buddha belonged. According to the Buddhist text Aṅguttara Nikāya and the Jaina text, the Bhagavati Sutra, Kosala was one of the Solasa (sixteen) Mahajanapadas (powerful realms) in 6th to 5th centuries BCE, and its cultural and political strength earned it the status of a great power.

After a series of wars with neighbouring kingdoms, it was finally defeated and absorbed into the Magadha kingdom in the 5th century BCE. After the collapse of the Maurya Empire and before the expansion of the Kushan Empire, Kosala was ruled by the Deva dynasty, the Datta dynasty, and the Mitra dynasty.

Location
Kosala was located between the Nepal hills in the north, the river Sadānīrā in the east, the river Sarpikā or Syandikā in the south, and the river Gomti in the west. The territory of Kosala corresponds to the modern-day Awadh region.

Religious textual references

In Buddhist and Jain texts

Mahavira, the 24th Tirthankara of Jainism taught in Kosala. A Buddhist text, the Majjhima Nikaya mentions Buddha as a Kosalan, which indicates that Kosala may have subjugated the Shakya clan, which the Buddha is traditionally believed to have belonged to.

In Vedic Literature 

Kosala is not mentioned in the early Vedic literature, but appears as a region in the later Vedic texts of the Shatapatha Brahmana (7th-6th centuries BCE, final version 300 BCE) and the Kalpasutras (6th-century BCE).

In Puranas
In the Ramayana, Mahabharata and the Puranas the ruling family of the Kosala kingdom was the Ikshvaku dynasty, which was descended from king Ikshvaku. The Puranas give lists of kings of the Ikshvaku dynasty from Ikshvaku to Prasenajit (Pali: Pasenadi). According to the Ramayana, Rama ruled the Kosala kingdom from his capital, Ayodhya.

History

Pre-Mauryan

Koshala's first capital of Shravasti was barely settled by the 6th century BCE, but there is the beginnings of a mud fort. By 500 BCE, Vedic people had spread to Koshala. 

By the 5th century BCE under the reign of King Mahakosala, the neighboring Kingdom of Kashi had been conquered. Mahakosala's daughter was the first wife of King Bimbisara of Magadha. As a dowry, Bimbisara received a Kashi village that had a revenue of 100,000. This marriage temporarily eased tensions between Koshala and Magadha.

By the time of Mahākosala's son Pasenadi, Kosala had become the suzerain of the Kālāma tribal republic, and Pasenadi's realm maintained friendly relations with the powerful Licchavi tribe which lived to the east of his kingdom.

During Pasenadi's reign, a Mallaka named Bandhula who had received education in Takṣaśilā, had offered his services as a general to the Kauśalya king so as to maintain the good relations between the Mallakas and Kosala. Later, Bandhula, along with his wife Mallikā, violated the  sacred tank of the Licchavikas, which resulted in armed hostilities between the Kauśalya and the Licchavikas. Bandhula was later treacherously murdered along with his sons by Pasenadi. In retaliation, some Mallakas helped Pasenadi's son Viḍūḍabha usurp the throne of Kosala to avenge the death of Bandhula, after which Pasenadi fled from Kosala and died in front of the gates of the Māgadhī capital of Rājagaha.

At some point during his reign, Viḍūḍabha fully annexed the Kālāmas. That the Kālāmas did not request a share of the Buddha's relics after his death was possibly because they had lost their independence by then.

Shortly after the Buddha's death, the Viḍūḍabha invaded the Sakya and Koliya republics, seeking to conquer their territories because they had once been part of Kosala. Viḍūḍabha finally triumphed over the Sakyas and Koliyas and annexed their state after a long war with massive loss of lives on both sides. Details of this war were exaggerated by later Buddhist accounts, which claimed that Viḍūḍabha's invasion was in retaliation for having given in marriage to his father the slave girl who became Viḍūḍabha's mother, and that he exterminated the Sakyas. In actuality, Viḍūḍabha's invasion of Sakya might instead have had similar motivations to the Māgadhī king Ajātasattu's conquest of the Vajjika League because he was the son of a Vajjika princess and was therefore interested in the territory of his mother's homeland. The result of the Kauśalya invasion was that the Sakyas and Koliyas were absorbed into Viḍūḍabha's kingdom.

The massive life losses incurred by Kosala during its conquest of Sakya weakened it significantly enough that it was itself was soon annexed by its eastern neighbour, the kingdom of Magadha, and Viḍūḍabha was defeated and killed by the Māgadhī king Ajātasattu.

Under the reign of Mahapadma Nanda of Magadha, Koshala rebelled but the rebellion was put down.

Under Mauryan rule
It is assumed that during the Mauryan reign, Kosala was administratively under the viceroy at Kaushambi. The Sohgaura copper plate inscription, probably issued during the reign of Chandragupta Maurya deals with a famine in Shravasti and the relief measures to be adopted by the officials. The Yuga Purana section of the Garga Samhita mentions about the Yavana (Indo-Greek) invasion and subsequent occupation of Saket during the reign of the last Maurya ruler Brihadratha.

Post-Mauryan period

The names of a number of rulers of Kosala of the post-Maurya period are known from the square copper coins issued by them, mostly found at Ayodhya. The rulers, forming the Deva dynasty, are: Muladeva, Vayudeva, Vishakhadeva, Dhanadeva, Naradatta, Jyesthadatta and Shivadatta. There is no way to know whether king Muladeva of the coins is identifiable with Muladeva, murderer of the Shunga ruler Vasumitra or not (though a historian, Jagannath has tried to do so). King Dhanadeva of the coins is identified with king Dhanadeva (1st century BCE) of Ayodhya inscription. In this Sanskrit inscription, King Kaushikiputra Dhanadeva mentions about setting a ketana (flag-staff) in memory of his father, Phalgudeva. In this inscription he claimed himself as the sixth in descent from Pushyamitra Shunga. Dhanadeva issued both cast and die-struck coins and both the types have a bull on obverse.

Other local rulers whose coins were found in Kosala include: a group of rulers whose name ends in "-mitra" is also known from their coins: Satyamitra, Aryamitra, Vijayamitra and Devamitra, sometimes called the "Late Mitra dynasty of Kosala". Other rulers known from their coins are: Kumudasena, Ajavarman and Sanghamitra.

Geography
The Kosala region had three major cities, Ayodhya, Saket and Shravasti, and a number of minor towns as Setavya, Ukattha, Dandakappa, Nalakapana and Pankadha. According to the Puranas and the Ramayana epic, Ayodhya was the capital of Kosala during the reign of Ikshvaku and his descendants. Shravasti is recorded as the capital of Kosala during the Mahajanapada period (6th–5th centuries BCE), but post-Maurya (2nd–1st centuries BCE) kings issued their coins from Ayodhya.

Culture and religion
Kosala belonged to the Northern Black Polished Ware culture (c. 700-300 BCE), which was preceded by the Black and red ware culture (c.c. 1450-1200 BCE until c. 700-500 BCE). The Central Gangetic Plain was the earliest area for rice cultivation in South Asia, and entered the Iron Age around 700 BCE. According to Geoffrey Samuel, following Tim Hopkins, the Central Gangetic Plain was culturally distinct from the Painted Grey Ware culture of the Vedic Aryans of Kuru-Pancala west of it, and saw an independent development toward urbanisation and the use of iron.

Local religions, before and during the rise of Buddhism and the later influence of the Vedic-Brahmanical traditions, were centered on laukika or worldly deities, including yaksas, guardian deities. According to Samuel, there is "extensive iconographical evidence for a religion of fertility and auspiciousness. According to Hopkins, the region was marked by a

In contrast to the developing Brahmanical traditions of the Kuru-Pancala region, the Kosala region "was where the early ascetic movements, including the Buddhists and Jains, took shape, and it was also a very important area for the Upanishads and developments in Brahmanical traditions." According to Samuels, Buddhism was not a protest against an already established Vedic-Brahmanical system, which developed in Kuru-Pancala, but an opposition against the growing influence of this Vedic-Brahmanical system, and the superior position granted to Brahmins in it.

See also

Kingdoms of Ancient India

References

Citations

Sources

 .
 
 
 
 
 
 
 
 .
 
 
 
 

 
Historical Indian regions
Mahajanapadas
Places in the Ramayana
History of Uttar Pradesh